Ylands is a 2019 sandbox game developed by Bohemia Interactive.

Gameplay
Developers describe Ylands as "sandbox exploration adventure and a platform for making custom games". The game has been compared to Minecraft and features a built-in editor that allows players to make their own scenarios.

Ylands gives players freedom in creation and modification of the countryside. Players can create their own character and choose an environment. Environments include temperate, tropical, winter etc. The editor allows the player to create their own scenario which allows gameplay set in different eras such as Wild West, medieval Europe or a steampunk world and others. Developers stated that they do not want to make any boundaries for players.

Development
The game was announced on 24 November 2017 when the Alpha version of the game was released on Bohemia Interactive's website. The game was formally announced worldwide on 1 November 2016 when it became part of project Bohemia Incubator. The Steam version of the game was announced on March 9, 2017 and released on December 6, 2017. According to the game's Steam page, the full version of the game was scheduled to be released 6–8 months after its release on Steam.

The game was released on 5 December 2019. The game switched to free-to-play as it was released.

Reception
The game was nominated for 4 Czech Game of the Year Awards including categories Main Award, Best technological solution, Best Game Design and Free-to-play. It managed to win in categories Best technological solution and Free-to-play

References

External links

Action video games
Construction and management simulation games
Open-world video games
Bohemia Interactive games
2019 video games
Video games developed in the Czech Republic
Windows games
Windows-only games